Marvin Esser (born 5 January 1994) is a German footballer who plays as a defender for SG Walluf.

Career
Esser made his professional debut for Wehen Wiesbaden in the 3. Liga on 18 May 2013, starting before being substituted out in the 46th minute for Daniel Döringer in the 2–4 home loss against Karlsruher SC.

References

External links
 Profile at DFB.de
 Profile at kicker.de
 Wehen Wiesbaden II statistics at Fussball.de
 TSG Wörsdorf statistics at Fussball.de
 FC Eddersheim statistics at Fussball.de
 FC Eddersheim II statistics at Fussball.de
 SG Walluf statistics at Fussball.de

1994 births
Living people
People from Rhein-Lahn-Kreis
Footballers from Rhineland-Palatinate
German footballers
Association football defenders
SV Wehen Wiesbaden players
3. Liga players